Saint Francis University (SFU) is a private Catholic university in Loretto, Pennsylvania. It was founded in 1847 and conducted under the tradition of the Franciscan Friars of the Third Order Regular.

History
Saint Francis College was established in 1847 by six Franciscan teaching Brothers from Mountbellew, Ireland, who had been given land in Loretto by Michael O'Connor, the first Bishop of Pittsburgh, to establish a school. The university was one of the first Catholic universities in the United States and the first Franciscan college in the nation. Although it originally only admitted males, it became one of the first Catholic Universities to become co-educational. Loretto is the site of the first English-language Roman Catholic settlement established west of the Allegheny Front, in what is now the United States, by Demetrius Augustine Gallitzin in 1799.

In 2001 Saint Francis College was approved to change to become a university by the Commonwealth of Pennsylvania and renamed to Saint Francis University.

Academics 
Saint Francis University enrolls approximately 1,658 undergraduate students (of whom 1,392 are traditional students and 266 are continuing education students) and 527 graduate students.  The university offers 25 undergraduate majors and 7 graduate fields of study (including Physical Therapy, in which the university awards a doctorate) to its students. The university maintains an average graduation rate of 70.3%.

Campus
The main building for the Southern Alleghenies Museum of Art, which also has a number of smaller facilities across the local region, is located on campus.  Also on the campus are The DiSepio Institute for Rural Health and Wellness, the Center for the Study of Occupational Regulation (CSOR), Center for Watershed Research & Service, and The Institute for Contemporary Franciscan Life.

Immergrün Golf Course is a semi-private, nine-hole, regulation-length 3,234-yard, par-36 course on rye grass located on the campus of Saint Francis University at 105 Saint Elizabeth Street. Immergrün has not been altered since Donald Ross built it for the steel magnate Charles M. Schwab in 1917.

Saint Francis University also runs a campus at Ambialet France in the Midi-Pyrénées. All classes are in English.

Athletics

Athletically, Saint Francis competes in the NCAA's Northeast Conference. Their nickname is the Red Flash. The University has a total of 22 varsity sports teams, with nine men's teams and 13 women's programs all competing in NCAA Division I. Men's sports include basketball, cross country, football, golf, soccer, tennis, and track & field competing in the Northeast Conference and volleyball, which competes in the Eastern Intercollegiate Volleyball Association (EIVA); while women's sports include basketball, bowling, cross country,  golf, lacrosse, soccer, softball, swimming, tennis, track & field and volleyball which compete in the Northeast Conference and field hockey which competes in the Atlantic 10 Conference (A-10). Saint Francis University will be adding Women's Water Polo in 2016-2017 school year as its 23 varsity sport at the Division 1 level. In addition to this, there are also two club sport teams, ice hockey and baseball.

Notable alumni

 Jeff Bower – professional basketball manager and college basketball coach.
 Captain Paul Boyton (1848–1924) - author, inventor, member of International Swimming Hall of Fame.
 James Casorio (Master's Degree in 1995) – Representative Pennsylvania House of Representatives 1997–2010.
 Dominic Joseph Mike Ryba (1903–1971) – professional baseball player.
 Calvin Fowler (1940–2013) – professional and Olympic basketball player.
 Mike Iuzzolino – professional basketball player and coach.
Lorenzo Jerome - professional football player.
 Nick Kolarac – professional soccer player.
 Rob Krimmel – college basketball coach.
 John Michael Kudrick – Eastern Catholic prelate and the current bishop of Parma for the Byzantines.
 Scott Layden – professional basketball manager and team owner.
 Brennan Manning (christened Richard Francis Xavier Manning) (1934–2013) – Christian author (e. g., The Ragamuffin Gospel), friar, priest and speaker.
 John A. Nagy – author on espionage and mutinies of the American Revolution.
 John Naioti (1921–1990) – professional football player.
 Steve Oroho – Republican Party politician, who has served since January 2008 in the New Jersey Senate, where he represents the 24th Legislative District.
 Tadeusz Piotrowski – author and sociologist.
 Kevin Porter – professional basketball player.
 Charles M. Schwab (1862–1939) – industrialist and member of the American Metal Market Steel Hall of Fame.
 Brian Sell – Distance runner and member of USA 2008 Olympic men's marathon team.
 Maurice Stokes (1933–1970) – professional basketball player; the NBA Twyman–Stokes Teammate of the Year Award is named in his honor.
 Thomas Joseph Tobin – current bishop of Diocese of Providence, Rhode Island.
 Norm Van Lier (1947–2009) – "Stormin' Norman," professional basketball player.

References

External links
 
 Saint Francis Athletics website

 
Franciscan universities and colleges
Universities and colleges in Cambria County, Pennsylvania
Association of Catholic Colleges and Universities
Educational institutions established in 1847
1847 establishments in Pennsylvania